A desiccant is a substance that absorbs water. It is most commonly used to remove humidity that would normally degrade or even destroy products sensitive to moisture.

List of desiccants:

 Activated alumina
 Aerogel
 Benzophenone (as anion)
 Bentonite clay 
 Calcium chloride
 Calcium oxide
 Calcium sulfate (Drierite)
 Cobalt(II) chloride
 Copper(II) sulfate
 Lithium chloride
 Lithium bromide
 Magnesium chloride hexahydrate
 Magnesium sulfate
 Magnesium perchlorate
 Molecular sieve
 Phosphorus pentoxide
 Potassium carbonate
 Potassium hydroxide
 Rice
 Silica gel
 Sodium
 Sodium chlorate
 Sodium chloride
 Sodium hydroxide
 Sodium sulfate
 Sucrose
 Sulfuric acid

External links
Education Center

Desiccants

nl:Lijst van droogmiddelen